Second tour is the fifth album by politically active French pop group Zebda. It is the group's 5th album, and the title (literally "second round") is a reference to the reformation of the group after a hiatus 2003-2011.

Track listing
 "Les Deux Écoles" – 3'59"
 "Le Dimanche autour de l'église" – 4'06"
 "Un je ne sais quoi" – 3'22"
 "Le Théorème du châle" – 3'55"
 "J'suis pas" – 3'32"
 "Harragas (les brûlés)" – 4'29"
 "Tu peux toujours courir" – 3'39"
 "La Promesse faite aux mains" – 3'48"
 "La Chance" – 3'53"
 "Les Proverbes" – 3'59"
 "Le Talent" – 4'02"
 "La Correction" – 4'25"

Charts

Weekly charts

Year-end charts

References

2012 albums
Zebda albums